Mustajab Shelle (Urdu: مستجاب شیلے ) is an artist who has painted thousands of book covers for Hindi novels. Shelle is an Amroha, India, based painter, whose original name is Mustajab Ahmad Siddiqui.
He has learnt the art of painting from Eqbal Mehdi.

After a long career of painting cover pages for Hindi pulp fiction, Shelle turned to realist and abstract painting using water and oil medium.

Shelle has participated in numerous exhibitions.

References

Living people
Indian male artists
Year of birth missing (living people)